Andreas Skoglund (born 22 March 2001) is a Norwegian Nordic combined skier.

The Trondheim based athlete competed at the 2018 and 2019 World Junior Championships. In 2018 he won a bronze medal in the team event, whereas in 2019 he won the bronze medal in the 10 kilometre race and a silver medal in the team event.

He made his FIS Nordic Combined World Cup debut in March 2019 in Holmenkollen, placing 37th. He collected his first World Cup points in December 2019 in Lillehammer with a 28th and a 16th place.

He represents the sports club Molde og Omegn IF.

His brother Aleksander Skoglund is also a competitive skier.

References 

2001 births
Living people
People from Molde
Norwegian male Nordic combined skiers
Sportspeople from Møre og Romsdal
21st-century Norwegian people